Nicholas Moore (16 September 1887–19 September 1985) was a notable New Zealand catholic priest. He was born in Kilmoganny, County Kilkenny, Ireland on 16 September 1887.
He was educated for the priesthood at St Kieran's College, Kilkenny, and ordained there.

References

People from County Kilkenny
1887 births
1985 deaths
20th-century New Zealand Roman Catholic priests
Irish emigrants to New Zealand